The 1959 Nebraska Cornhuskers football team was the representative of the University of Nebraska and member of the Big 7 Conference in the 1959 NCAA University Division football season. The team was coached by Bill Jennings and played their home games at Memorial Stadium in Lincoln, Nebraska.

Before the season
Coach Jennings oversaw some minor changes to his assistant coaches, the most noteworthy being the replacement of longtime assistant L. F. Klien.  The one new member of the staff, Russ Faulkinberry, would eventually go on to lead the Southwestern Louisiana Ragin' Cajuns, and was the one who renamed them as the Ragin' Cajuns during his tenure.  With the new staff in place, Jennings was charged with proving that the two non-conference upset victories during the previous season were not flukes, and that he could do better than 6th place in the Big 7.  This would not be an easy task to fulfill, as yet another difficult non-conference schedule loomed, with visits by Texas, Oregon State and Indiana, as well as a road trip to rival Minnesota.  The stakes for this year's homecoming game were also increased, as perennial Big 7 champion Oklahoma moved up from the usual season-ending spot to appear in Lincoln for that game.

Schedule

Roster

Starters

Coaching staff

Game summaries

Texas

The bright spot on this day for the Cornhusker faithful was when HB Pat Fischer ran 92 yards to score in a repeat performance of the same feat accomplished in last year's surprise defeat of Penn State.  However, a clipping penalty resulted in the score being called back.  Nothing else went right for Nebraska in game as #17 Texas rolled off 20 points and started Nebraska's season off with a 0–20 shutout loss.  This was only the second time the teams had met, and they were now even at 1–1 after Nebraska's 1933 win.

Minnesota

At first it seemed like it was going to be another dark day for Nebraska in Minneapolis, the site of so many severe drubbings, as Minnesota took the early lead.  As the clock wore on, however, the Golden Gophers began to stall, and the Cornhuskers capitalized to go up 13–12 by the half.  Minnesota came out flat after the break and never scored again, as Nebraska punched in another 19 points to secure an unexpected and long-sought victory over their main northern rival.  It was only the 6th win that the Cornhuskers had earned over Minnesota in 36 attempts dating back to 1900.

Oregon State

Nebraska's defense answered the call on this day as the Beavers repeatedly approached the goal line and were turned away time and time again.  The day was a defensive affair on both sides, and despite the hard work of both teams that netted only one touchdown each, the outcome was ultimately decided by Nebraska's successful extra point, kicked through the uprights by PK Harry Tolly.  The Cornhuskers improved to 7–2 over Oregon State all-time.

Kansas

The Cornhuskers were hard-pressed to bring a full-strength team out to face Kansas, as numerous injuries had hobbled starters during the nonconference matchups.  The Jayhawks fought Nebraska close, the teams combining to forge a mere 3–3 score by the half.  Then, disaster struck the Cornhuskers when starting QB Tom Kramer was injured and came out of the game, severely hampering Nebraska's ability to score.  The Jayhawks did put in another touchdown to take the win, moving to 16–46–3 in the series.  Kramer's injury turned out to be severe enough that he was lost for the season, which considerably darkened the outlook for a successful Nebraska season.

Indiana

Barely two minutes into the game, the Cornhuskers gave up a fumble which was quickly converted into points by the Hoosiers.  Indiana then held the lead for the rest of the day, helped along by Cornhusker blunders and inexperience.  A lone Nebraska touchdown avoided the shutout as Indiana enjoyed their 10th straight undefeated game against the Cornhuskers and improved to 9–3–3 in the series.

Missouri

With the season's momentum waning, the Cornhuskers traveled to Columbia and were wholly ineffective at making any offensive production.  The game had opened with an early Missouri field goal that was made possible by a disputed call.  Any question that the game was thrown by the call was set aside when the Tigers scored again in the second half with no attached controversy.  Missouri improved to 21–28–3 in the series and kept the Missouri-Nebraska bell for the third year in a row.  The scoreless Nebraska squad returned to Lincoln with the season's second shutout loss and carrying a 2–4 record so far, with conference champion powerhouse Oklahoma next on the slate.

Oklahoma

Reigning 12-year league champion Oklahoma arrived in Lincoln favored by two touchdowns, and there was little reason to expect anything else.  Throughout the first half, the Cornhuskers bravely fought to keep up, matching each of the two Sooner touchdowns but missing the extra points.  Coming out after the break behind 12–14, it only remained to see how much longer the Nebraska squad could keep up before running out of steam and becoming the latest team defeated by Oklahoma.  Nebraska opened the second half with a field goal to go ahead for the first time, and to everyone's surprise, kept the Sooners off the scoreboard for the rest of the quarter.  Suddenly, the game was in reach, and the emboldened Cornhuskers added another touchdown with help from a lost Sooner fumble, and a field goal, to go ahead 25–14 before the stunned crowd.  Oklahoma came to life and responded to move within four points, and then quickly forced a Nebraska punt to get the ball again.  Marching down the field for 67 yards in just nine plays, the Sooners were set to take back the game when Cornhusker QB Ron Meade, on the field assisting the defense, picked off an Oklahoma pass in the end zone with less than a minute remaining to seal the upset victory.  The Oklahoma loss was the first conference defeat in Sooner Head Coach Bud Wilkinson's 13-year career, snapped Oklahoma's remarkable 74-game league winning streak, and snapped Nebraska's 16-game losing streak to the Sooners in what was arguably the greatest triumph in Coach Jennings' career.  Nebraska made a bid to take back the series with Oklahoma, moving to 17–18–3.

Iowa State

Riding high on the upset defeat of Oklahoma the week prior, Nebraska now had an outside shot at the conference championship and a trip to the Orange Bowl for the first time since 1954, if the now-vulnerable Sooners would lose another game or two.  Iowa State was unimpressed with the Cornhuskers, however, and held them off of the scoreboard for nearly the entire game.  Nebraska avoided the shutout on the road with just a single fourth-quarter touchdown.  It was a very abrupt reversal of fortunes for a Nebraska team that had seen great success and dismal defeat just weeks apart.  The Cyclone win was their 10th in all 53 attempts.

Colorado

The last home game of 1959 was on a very cold day, and Colorado arrived enjoying a three-game winning streak over the Cornhuskers.  The matchup was a fairly evenly played affair, with the outcome decided by the abilities of the kickers.  Nebraska QB Ron Meade's two kicks after touchdowns were good, while the two Buffalo kicks were not.  Nebraska's 1959 seniors left Memorial Stadium for the last time, with a win, the program's 150th conference victory all-time.  Colorado slipped to 8–10–0 in the series.

Kansas State

The Cornhuskers were heavily favored to beat the weakened Wildcats despite the two-game winning streak that Kansas State had in the series.  A season defined by the dramatic upset over Oklahoma was destined to end with an embarrassing 14–29 defeat at the hands of the undermanned and outgunned Kansas State squad.  The Wildcats took their third straight game against Nebraska to try to close the gap in the series, moving to 9–32–2.

After the season
Head Coach Jennings's third campaign left the fans unsure of what to expect going forward.  Flashes of brilliance with underdog defeats of Minnesota and Oklahoma this year, preceded by upsets of Pittsburgh and Penn State in 1958, were offset by unexplained losses to weak teams and the third overall losing season in a row, with Big 7 finishes of 7th, 6th, and 6th over his tenure.  The university opted to continue with their current football coach, and Jennings hoped to move forward and improve on his career record of 8–22–0 (.267), and especially his conference record of 4–14–0 (.222).  Nebraska's overall program total slipped for the ninth straight year, tying the nine-year percentage slide record set from 1941 to 1949, as it fell to 359–211–34 (.623).  The conference record also dropped further as well, to 150–72–12 (.667).

Future professional players
Pat Fischer, 1961 17th-round pick of the St. Louis Cardinals
Ron McDole, 1961 4th-round pick of the St. Louis Cardinals
Mick Tingelhoff, Minnesota Vikings
Carroll Zaruba, 1960 1st-round pick of the Dallas Texans- AFL

References

Nebraska
Nebraska Cornhuskers football seasons
Nebraska Cornhuskers football